Kulsoom Hazara (born 4 September 1988) is a Pakistani karateka.

Background 
Hazara is the youngest of four children: three sisters and one brother and belongs to the Hazara community of Quetta, Balochistan. She lost her mother to cancer at the age of two and her father to a heart attack at the age of 9. On her father's death, her eldest sister, Fatima and her cousin and brother-in-law, Sarwar Ali became her guardians. In 2000, due to the sectarian violence in her hometown, she shifted to Karachi. The loss of her brother-in-law in 2003, proved traumatic and changed her life.  Kulsoom completed 13th South Asian Games in Kathmandu, Nepal, she won a gold and silver medal despite an injury, securing a place as a prominent karateka woman in South Asia.

Career 
Her father got her admitted to a karate club owned by Sarwar Ali, when she was five.

National 
Hazara initially represented Pakistan Army before switching to WAPDA. She won her first national level gold medal in 2005.

Owing to her meritorious achievements, Hazara received 'Icon of the Nation' award in 2017.

International 
She represented Pakistan for the first time at the 4th Islamic Women's Games held in Tehran, Iran in 2005. She came fifth.

In 2010, she won her first medals, two bronze at the South Asian Games held in Dhaka, Bangladesh.

In 2012, she was part of the first ever women's team sent to the Asian Championships, which were held in Tashkent, Uzbekistan.

At the 2016 South Asian Karate Championship held in New Delhi, India, she won two medals: a gold and a silver. In the 2017 Championship held in Colombo, Sri Lanka, she won another gold in -68 kg and a bronze in team kumite. In the -68 kg final she defended her title by defeating her opponent by 10 points to 2.

In 2018, she participated in the Asian Games held in Jakarta, Indonesia.

At the 2019 South Asian Games in Kathmandu, Nepal, Hazara won gold in the team kumite event and a silver in the -68 kg event.

Events 
Hazara has participated in the following international events:

 4th Islamic Women Games 2005, Tehran, Iran
 10th South Asian Games 2006, Colombo, Sri Lanka
 11th South Asian Games 2010, Dhaka, Bangladesh
 11th Senior Cadet AKF (Asian) Championship 2012, Tashkent, Uzbekistan
 17th Asian Games 2014, Incheon, South Korea 
 3rd South Asian Karate Championship 2016, New Delhi, India 
 4th South Asian karate championship 2017, Colombo, Sri Lanka
 4th Islamic Solidarity Game 2017, Baku, Azerbaijan
 Karate 1 Premier League 2017, Dubai, UAE
 15th AKF Senior Championship 2018, Amman, Jordan
 18th Asian Games 2018, Jakarta, Indonesia
 Karate 1 Series A 2018, Shanghai, China
 13th South Asian Games 2019, Kathmandu, Nepal

Film 
In 2018, Sharmeen Obaid-Chinoy made a short film about her titled, "Kulsoom Hazara - The Karate Wonder"

References 

Living people
1988 births
South Asian Games gold medalists for Pakistan
South Asian Games silver medalists for Pakistan
People from Quetta
Sportspeople from Quetta
Pakistani people of Hazara descent
Hazara sportspeople